Isabel Frey is an Austrian left-wing politician, activist, and Yiddish musician based in Vienna. In 2020, she ran for district council in the historically Jewish Leopoldstadt district for the party LINKS Wien in Vienna municipal elections. Her first album, Millenial Bundist, was released in September, 2020.

Personal life
Born in Vienna to a "bourgeois" secular Ashkenazi Jewish family, Frey was active in the Socialist-Zionist Hashomer Hatzair youth movement as a child. She is the daughter of liberal newspaper journalist Eric Frey and TV journalist Katinka Nowotny. Her paternal grandparents were Holocaust survivors. Her family were active in the Zionist movement and held a strong aversion to Yiddish. Describing her family as a "bit assimilated, but not completely", she attended Sunday school and went to shul on holidays. She did not learn Yiddish as a child, due to her family's "Austro-Hungarian assimilated roots". They spoke Hungarian and German, regarding Yiddish as "low class". As a young woman, after living on a kibbutz in southern Israel, Frey returned to Austria and developed a diasporic, Yiddishist, anti-Zionist worldview. Frey became a bat mitzvah at Or Chadasch, the Reform synagogue in Vienna that was founded by her grandparents and where her father serves as president.

Frey studied social sciences at Amsterdam University College, as well as medical anthropology and sociology at the University of Amsterdam. She is a Phd candidate in the "Music matters" structured doctoral program at the University of Music and Performing Arts Vienna.

Politics
A self-described "Bundist", "left-wing Jew", and anti-racist, Frey identifies with the "secular, socialist Yiddish" political tradition that was once strong among Central and Eastern European Ashkenazi Jews. As an anti-Zionist and an anti-assimilationist, the Bundist concept of "doykeit" (hereness) resonates with her. She described the Israeli government as "ethnonationalist". Neither religious nor nationalist, she regards Zionism as an "absurdity" and a "sham" responsible for "peddling an artificial identity" among secular European Jews. Frey dislikes the militarism within Israeli culture and supports a "multinational, liberal, democratic Israel-Palestine".

Frey has described philosemitism as being particularly strong in many European countries due to "Holocaust guilt" and a "remembrance culture" of the Holocaust. She believes that philosemitism in Austria and Germany causes Jews to be "fetishized" in a "pseudo-tolerant way". She believes she benefits from white privilege and class privilege as a middle-class white Jewish Austrian, a view she regards as controversial because "in the Austrian theatre of remembrance Jews can only be the most oppressed minority." She has spoken against antisemitism directed against Austrian and German Jews by non-Jewish leftists.

References

External links
 
Official website
Isabel Frey on YouTube

20th-century Austrian Jews
21st-century Austrian Jews
Anti-Zionist Jews
Austrian anti-racism activists
Austrian Ashkenazi Jews
Austrian expatriates in Israel
Austrian expatriates in the Netherlands
Austrian Reform Jews
Austrian women singers
Austrian communists
Bundists
Hashomer Hatzair members
Jewish anti-racism activists
Jewish Austrian politicians
Jewish socialists
Kibbutzniks
Living people
Opposition to antisemitism in Austria
Palestinian solidarity activists
People from Leopoldstadt
Secular Jews
University of Amsterdam alumni
Yiddish-language singers
Year of birth missing (living people)